Austropetalia is a genus of dragonflies in the family Austropetaliidae, 
endemic to south-eastern Australia.
Species of Austropetalia are medium-sized to large dragonflies with brown and yellow markings.

Species
The genus Austropetalia includes the following species:

Austropetalia annaliese 
Austropetalia patricia  - Waterfall redspot
Austropetalia tonyana  - Alpine redspot

See also
 List of dragonflies of Australia

References

Austropetaliidae
Anisoptera genera
Odonata of Australia
Insects of Australia
Endemic fauna of Australia
Taxa named by Robert John Tillyard
Insects described in 1916